The 1879 Welsh Cup Final, was the second in the competition. It was contested by Newtown White Star and Wrexham at the Cricket Field, Oswestry.

Route to the Final

Newtown White Star

Wrexham

Final

References

1879
1878–79 in Welsh football
Wrexham A.F.C. matches